Siniša Kelečević (born April 10, 1970) is a Croatian former basketball player. He played the forward and center positions. He was named to the 2002 Israeli Basketball Premier League Quintet.

Biography
Kelečević is from Šibenik, Croatia. He is 6' 10" (208 cm) tall, and weighs 216 pounds (98 kg).

He played for Hapoel Jerusalem, Pallacanestro Trieste, Pallalcesto Amatori Udine, Acqua San Bernardo Cantu, and Telekom Baskets Bonn. Kelečević was named to the 2002 Israeli Basketball Premier League Quintet.

With the Croatia men's national basketball team, Kelečević played in 47 games including in the 1995, 1997, and 1999 European Championships for Men, as well as in EuroBasket 1997.

References 

Living people

Croatian expatriate basketball people in Israel

Croatian expatriate basketball people in Germany

Hapoel Jerusalem B.C. players
Pallacanestro Trieste players

1970 births
Centers (basketball)
Croatian expatriate basketball people in Italy
Croatian men's basketball players
Pallalcesto Amatori Udine players
Telekom Baskets Bonn players
Basketball players from Šibenik
KK Borik Puntamika players
KK Zrinjevac players
KK Zadar players